Conchoecia is a genus of ostracods in the subfamily Conchoeciinae.

The genus contains bioluminescent species. Conchoecia have a coelenterazine luciferin based bioluminescent system, unlike the cypridinid luciferin based system found in the Cypridinidae.

Species 
The following species are recognised in the genus Conchoecia:

Conchoecia angustipilata 
Conchoecia belgicae 
Conchoecia giesbrechti 
Conchoecia glandulosa 
Conchoecia hettacra 
Conchoecia indica 
Conchoecia isocheira 
Conchoecia kyrtophora 
Conchoecia leptothrix 
Conchoecia magna 
Conchoecia rudyakovi 
Conchoecia sculpta 
Conchoecia subarcuata 
Conchoecia teretivalvata

See also 
 List of prehistoric ostracod genera

References

External links 
 

Ostracod genera
Halocyprida
Bioluminescent ostracods